Pudendal nerve entrapment (PNE), also known as Alcock canal syndrome,  is an uncommon source of chronic pain in which the pudendal nerve (located in the pelvis) is entrapped or compressed in Alcock's canal. There are several different types of PNE based on the site of entrapment anatomically (see Anatomy).  Pain is positional and is worsened by sitting.  Other symptoms include genital numbness, fecal incontinence and urinary incontinence.

The term pudendal neuralgia (PN) is often used interchangeably with "pudendal nerve entrapment". This condition can greatly affect a persons’ quality of life. Pudendal neuralgia can be caused by many factors including inflammation, extreme cycling, and can be a "secondary condition to childbirth". A 2009 review study found both that "prevalence of PN is unknown and it seems to be a rare event" and that "there is no evidence to support equating the presence of this syndrome with a diagnosis of pudendal nerve entrapment," meaning that it is possible to have all the symptoms of pudendal nerve entrapment (otherwise known as pudendal neuralgia) based on the criteria specified at Nantes in 2006, without having an entrapped pudendal nerve.

A 2015 study of 13 normal female cadavers found that the pudendal nerve was attached or fixed to the sacrospinous ligament (therefore "entrapped") in all cadavers studied, suggesting that the diagnosis of pudendal nerve entrapment may be overestimated.

Symptoms
There are no specific clinical signs or complementary test results for this condition.

Genito-anal numbness, fecal and/or urinary incontinence can occur. People may also experience a burning pain in perianal or genital areas.

In male competitive cyclists, it is often called "cyclist syndrome", in which cyclists rarely develop recurrent numbness of the penis and scrotum after prolonged cycling, or an altered sensation of ejaculation, with disturbance of micturition (urination) and reduced awareness of defecation. Nerve entrapment syndromes, presenting as genitalia numbness, are amongst the most common bicycling associated urogenital problems.

Pain, if present, is positional and typically caused by sitting and relieved by standing, lying down or sitting on a toilet seat. If the perineal pain is positional (changes with a person's position, for example sitting or standing), this suggests a tunnel syndrome. Anesthesiologist John S. McDonald of UCLA reports that sitting pain relieved by standing or sitting on a toilet seat is the most reliable diagnostic parameter.

A systematic review study found that PN may be implicated in various sexual dysfunctions such as persistent genital arousal disorder (PGAD), erectile dysfunction, premature ejaculation, and vestibulodynia. Additionally, another review that looked at cycling-related sexual dysfunction suggested that cycling may indirectly cause sexual dysfunction by disturbing the testosterone signaling aspect of the hypothalamic-pituitary-gonadal axis of the body.

Anatomy 
The pudendal nerve carries both motor and sensory axons. It stems from the spinal nerves S2-S4 of the sacral plexus. The nerve progresses through the piriformis and coccygeus muscles and exits the pelvis by passing through the greater sciatic foramen. The pudendal nerve then re-enters the pelvic cavity by passing through the lesser sciatic foramen. After re-entering the pelvis, it breaks off into three branches known as the inferior rectal nerve, the perineal nerve, and then dorsal sensory nerve of the penis or clitoris. These three nerves are also referred to as the terminal branches, and they are more susceptible to injuries due to their locations.

There are also four levels of Pudendal nerve entrapment compressions: entrapment below the piriformis muscle, entrapment that occurs between the sacrospinous ligament and sacrotuberous ligament (most common cause), entrapment in the Alcock canal, and entrapment of the terminal branches. Although there has been no evidence for a direct functional connection between the pudendal nerve and sacrotuberous ligament, many clinical studies have pointed at the sacrotuberous ligament as a potential cause of PNE. Around the ischial level of the spine, pudendal nerve runs between the sacrotuberous ligament and the sacrospinous ligament (posteriorly and anteriorly, respectively), giving way for potential compression of the pudendal nerve.

Causes
PNE is said to be caused by genitoanal surgical scarring and mishaps in the pelvic region, trauma to the pelvis, pregnancy, childbirth, bicycling and anatomic abnormalities. Vaginal birth may lead to pudendal nerve damage from the stretch during delivery and the likelihood increases when delivering larger than average babies. As the pudendal nerve lies in the pelvic region, surgical procedures that involve this area, such as a cesarean section, can cause nerve injury.

PNE can present in cyclists, likely due to both the compression and stretching of the pudendal nerve for prolonged time. Heavy and prolonged bicycling, especially if an inappropriately shaped or incorrectly positioned bicycle seat is used, may eventually thicken the sacrotuberous and/or sacrospinous ligaments and trap the nerve between them, resulting in PNE.

Anatomic abnormalities can result in PNE due to the pudendal nerve being fused to different parts of the anatomy, or trapped between the sacrotuberous and sacrospinalis ligaments.

Diagnosis
Labat et al state that "there are no specific clinical signs or complementary test results of this disease". Kaur et al confirm that there are no specific and consistent radiological findings in patients with PNE.

Diagnostic tests that can be performed to suggest PNE are:

 Pudendal nerve blocks to confirm the pudendal nerve is the source of pain through relief from the procedure. These diagnostic blocks can also be used in place of spinal anesthesia during delivery.
 Quantitative sensory threshold testing to detect the inability to sense temperature changes.
 High-frequency ultrasonography to identify the location of pudendal nerve compression.
 Doppler ultra sound to detect vein compression, a result of nerve compression. 
 Pudendal nerve terminal motor latency test, an invasive diagnostic test that involves a rectal or vaginal exam.

Diagnoses are made through neurophysiological testing rather than imaging. However, MRI and CT imaging may be used to exclude other diagnoses.

Similar to a Tinel's sign digital palpation of the ischial spine may produce pain. In contrast, people may report temporary relief with a diagnostic pudendal nerve block (see Injections), typically infiltrated near the ischial spine. It is important to note that the duration of pain relief from pudendal nerve block is different per person.
 
Imaging studies using MR neurography may be useful. In people with unilateral pudendal entrapment in the Alcock's canal, it is typical to see asymmetric swelling and hyperintensity affecting the pudendal neurovascular bundle.

Nantes Criteria 
Pudendal nerve entrapment is difficult to diagnose and there are no specific examinations that can clearly confirm the diagnosis. A multidisciplinary group in Nantes, France developed diagnostic criteria ("Nantes Criteria") to serve as a guide to physicians in diagnosing PNE. It consists of inclusions, exclusions, and complementary characteristics of the syndrome. Some sources discourage the use of this guide due to errors found in the criteria.

Inclusion criteria are:

 The involved area corresponds to the area of supplied by the pudendal nerve (anus to the clitoris or penis).
 Pain worsened by sitting, because of increased pressure on the nerve. 
 The patient is not awoken by pain during sleep.
 No objective loss of sensation on clinical examination. Loss of superficial sensation in the perineal area is more indicative of a lesion at the root of the sacral nerves. 
 Pain relieved by an anesthetic block of the pudendal nerve.

Exclusion criteria are:

 Imaging results used for exclusion
 Unilateral pain 
 Abnormal diagnostic test results
 Pain is acute

Complementary criteria are:

 Nerve pain associated with extreme sensitivity to touch
 Described as burning/shooting pain 
 Posterior pain following defecation

A systematic review by Indraccolo et al analyzed PN due to pudendal entrapment and PN without pudendal entrapment in women with chronic pelvic-perianal pain. The review classified the Nantes' criteria as the gold standard for diagnosing PN secondary to PNE. Because of this, the authors of the systematic review additionally suggest that the criteria may be useful in assessing the efficacy and effectiveness of the pudendal nerve entrapment treatments that people may undergo.

Differential diagnosis 
Differential diagnosis should consider the far commoner conditions chronic prostatitis/chronic pelvic pain syndrome and interstitial cystitis. Other causes for similar symptoms of pudendal nerve entrapment include compression from a tumor, prostatitis in males, uterine diseases in females, complex regional pain syndrome (CRPS), superficial skin infections, and other neuropathies that share the same region as the pudendal nerve.

Treatment

Treatments include behavioral modifications, physical therapy, analgesics and other medications, pudendal nerve block, and surgical nerve decompression. A newer form of treatment is pulsed radiofrequency. Most medical treatments are intended for symptomatic relief, such as pain. If symptoms are not managed through this standard of care, surgery is considered.

Nerve protection 
This is a form of self treatment to keep pressure off the pudendal nerve. It involves avoiding any activities that may increase pain in the pelvic area.  A seat cushion with the center area removed may be used to provide relief and prevent further pain. A 2021 systematic review of preventative and therapeutic strategies found that cyclists who take precautions in maintaining proper posture may prevent the development of a more severe disorder. It is also suggested that using a wider seat when cycling could prevent damage to the nerve, but more evidence is necessary to show long-term benefit.

Physical therapy
Mobilization of the nerves and muscles in the pelvic region is a proposed way to treat symptoms associated with a nerve entrapment. An example of this is neural mobilization. The goal of neural mobilization is to restore the functionality of the nerve and muscles through a variety of exercises involving the lower extremities. Exercises to specifically target the pudendal nerve would be determined based on the anatomical layout of the nerve. It is important to note that evidence is limited to show support for this therapy.

Another possible treatment for nerve entrapments in the pelvic region would be stretching and strengthening exercises. A treatment plan would be determined by a physical therapist to specifically manipulate the pudendal nerve through a variety of stretches. Strengthening exercises may also be recommended to relieve the excessive pressure caused by the entrapment, but there is currently limited evidence to support this choice of therapy.

Medications
There are numerous pharmaceutical treatments for neuropathic pain associated with pudendal neuralgia.  Drugs used include anti-epileptics (like gabapentin), antidepressants (like amitriptyline), and palmitoylethanolamide. Often times polypharmacy is used with consideration of medication history and side effects.

Injections
One way to identify and alleviate pain associated with the pudendal nerve is a "CT-guided nerve block." During this procedure, "a long-acting local anesthetic (bupivacaine hydrochloride) and a corticosteroid (e.g. methylprednisolone) are injected to provide immediate pudendal anesthesia." A pudendal nerve block can be inserted from several different anatomical locations including: transvaginal, transperitoneal, and perirectal. A reduction in pain following this injection is typically felt quickly. The most common side effect of a pudendal nerve block is injection site irritation. Relief from chronic pain may be achieved through this procedure due to the reduced inflammation from the steroid  medication, and "steroid-induced fat necrosis" which "can reduce inflammation in the region around the nerve" to lessen strain on the pudendal nerve. This treatment may alleviate symptoms for up to 73% of people. Treatment of pudendal nerve entrapment by nerve block is not often prescribed due to "discomfort associated with the local injections as well as the risk of injuring critical structures."

Pulsed radiofrequency
This can be used instead of pudendal nerve perineural injections. In recent years, Pulsed radiofrequency (PRF) is starting to become more common for managing chronic pain, and has shown to have long-term benefits and low problem occurrences. Pulsed radiofrequency has also been successful in treating a refractory case of pudendal neuralgia, but additional research is needed to study the effectiveness of pulsed radiofrequency on treating pudendal nerve entrapment. Pudendal Nerve Stimulation (PNS) was found to significantly decrease subjective pain levels in people with pudendal neuralgia. A majority of people who underwent PNS reported "significant" or "remarkable" pain relief at 2 weeks after treatment.

Ergonomics
Various ergonomic devices can be used to allow an individual to sit while helping to take pressure off of the nerve. A few recommendations to decrease nerve compression while cycling include having soft, wide seat in a horizontal position and setting the handlebar height lower than the seat. There are also bicycle seats designed to prevent pudendal nerve compression, these seats usually have a narrow channel in the middle of them. Additionally, other recommendations include wearing padded bike shorts, standing on pedals periodically, shifting to higher gears, and taking frequent breaks. For sitting on hard surfaces, a cushion or coccyx cushion can be used to take pressure off the nerves.

Surgical
Decompression surgery is a "last resort", according to surgeons who perform the operation. It is highly controversial, given that normal cadavers show the pudendal nerve to be "entrapped" and attached, questioning the whole thesis of pudendal nerve entrapment.

According to supporters of the theory of PNE, surgery is indicated when severe symptoms are present after exhausting all other forms of treatment. The surgery is also another option to confirm the diagnosis of pudendal nerve entrapment.

The surgery is performed by a small number of surgeons in a limited number of countries. The validity of decompression surgery as a treatment and the existence of entrapment as a cause of pelvic pain are highly controversial. While a few doctors will prescribe decompression surgery, most will not. Notably, in February 2003 the European Association of Urology in its Guidelines on Pelvic Pain said that expert centers in Europe have found no cases of PNE and that surgical success is rare:

There are several different approaches in order to perform a decompression surgery on the pudendal nerve. The different access areas include: superior transgluteal, superior retrosciatic, inferior retrosciatic, medial transgluteal, inferior transgluteal and transischial entry. The transgluteal entry involves "neurolysis of the PN at the infrapiriform canal and transection of the sacrospinal ligament." Another point of entry which is described as a "perineal para-anal pathway",  "follows the inferior rectal nerve to the Alcock’s canal."

If nerve damage is discovered, other surgery options may be considered like a "neurectomy" or "neuromodulation".

References 

Peripheral nervous system disorders